Zornes is a surname. Notable people with the surname include:

Dick Zornes (born 1944), American football player, coach, and college athletics administrator
Milford Zornes (1908–2008), American painter

German-language surnames